Christy Elliott (26 May 1951 – 17 April 2011) was an Irish boxer. He competed in the men's light middleweight event at the 1972 Summer Olympics.

References

1951 births
2011 deaths
Irish male boxers
Olympic boxers of Ireland
Boxers at the 1972 Summer Olympics
Place of birth missing
Light-middleweight boxers